The Bruyer Granary, located at 1355 Whitefish Stage Rd. in Kalispell, Montana, was built in 1909.  It was listed on the National Register of Historic Places in 2006.

The granary was built by Julius Bruyer and sons.  It is a tall two-story building with a pyramidal roof which served the Bruyers' Kal-Mont Dairy.

References

Agricultural buildings and structures on the National Register of Historic Places in Montana
Buildings and structures completed in 1909
National Register of Historic Places in Flathead County, Montana
Granaries
1909 establishments in Montana